The 1953 San Diego State Aztecs football team represented San Diego State College during the 1953 college football season.

San Diego State competed in the California Collegiate Athletic Association (CCAA). The team was led by seventh-year head coach Bill Schutte, and played home games at both Aztec Bowl and Balboa Stadium. They finished the season with five wins, three losses and one tie (5–3–1, 3–1–1 CCAA). Overall, the team outscored its opponents 230–142 for the season.

Schedule

Team players in the NFL
The following San Diego State players were selected in the 1954 NFL Draft.

Notes

References

San Diego State
San Diego State Aztecs football seasons
San Diego State Aztecs football